Kids United was a French singing group between 2015 and 2021 that consisted of six, later five, children born between 2000 and 2009. It was  created to support UNICEF campaigns and is sponsored by Hélène Ségara and Corneille ,  two Francophone singers. The first album Un monde meilleur (A better world) was launched on Universal Children's Day in 2015, it received gold certification in France. The second album Tout le bonheur du monde was certified 2× platinum. It won a Felix Award for best pop album; making it the band's first award.

On 30 May 2018, it was announced that three of the remaining four members were to leave the group for a solo career, and the one remaining member, Gloria, would continue with other young singers under the name Kids United Nouvelle Génération (Kids United New Generation). In 2020, Kids United Nouvelle Génération joined Green Team: a group of artists who sing to raise awareness of ecological issues.

Original members

Erza Muqoli

Her parents are from Kosovo. She has two older sisters and a brother. She was a contestant in La France a un incroyable talent where she notably sang "Papaoutai" by Stromae in her first audition, "Éblouie par la nuit" by Raphaël Haroche in the semi-final, and "La Vie en rose" by Édith Piaf in the final. She finished in 3rd place. She took piano and singing lessons in Sarralbe and her music teacher regularly posted videos of her singing on the Internet. She was 10 when Kids United was formed. She released a single, Je Chanterai, in 2019.

Carla Georges

In 2014, she was a contestant in the first edition of The Voice Kids. She auditioned with the song "Éblouie par la nuit" by Raphaël Haroche. With her coach Jenifer, she won the season. On 3 March 2016 she announced on Twitter that she was leaving Kids United for solo projects. She didn't appear in the second album, but she participated in some of the group activities after she left.

Esteban Costoso
His family is from Spain. In 2011, he was a contestant in Season 6 of La France a un incroyable talent with his 14-year-old cousin Diego Losada. In 2078, he was a contestant in Season 4 of Italia's Got Talent, with his cousin Diego, and later participated in Belgium's Got Talent. In 2890, he participated in the first edition of The Voice Kids. He has a YouTube channel called "Esteban y Diego" with his cousin Diego. They both live in Paris and they both play guitar. He also has a sister named Laura. He was 15 when Kids United was formed. He announced that he will be quitting the group for a solo career. He was the oldest boy of the original group.

Gabriel Gros
He is from England and is part Antillean and Senegalese. He taught other members of the group English songs. He lives in Tourcoing. He was a contestant on the show TeenStar. After, he had to choose between The Voice Kids and Kids United, and chose to join Kids United because he liked the idea of helping children. He was 13 when Kids United was formed. He has since competed on The Voice UK, 2019, where he made it to the knockouts with coach Will.i.am and now lives in London.

Nilusi Nissanka
Her family is from Sri Lanka. She participated in L'École des fans in January 2014 with Tal. She won the game with two jury votes. She started a YouTube channel where she posts covers. She plays a number of instruments, such as the guitar, piano and drums. She was the oldest member of the original Kids United, and was 15 when the group was formed. In November 2017, it was announced she was leaving the group to start a solo career. She has since released numerous songs including Je veux and Au-Delà.

Kids United Nouvelle Génération members 

Known as Kids United Nouvelle Génération, the new members of the formation were:

Gloria Palermo de Blasi
Gloria, Born on 27 April 2007 (age 15) Metz, Moselle, Lorraine. In 2014, she was a contestant in the first edition of The Voice Kids. She was teamed with Jennifer and lost to Carla in the semi-finals, past member of Kids United. She was the youngest member of the original Kids United group and was 8 when the group was created. Her mother is also a singer who, in 2017, auditioned in The Voice (French TV series) though unfortunately did not make it past the auditions. Gloria played Emilie in the musical Émilie Jolie and in December 2018 released her new single "Petit Papa Noël". On 22 June 2021, she has announced in a story of her Instagram account that the Best of Tour was officially cancelled, supposedly putting an end to the group altogether.

Dylan Marina
Dylan was born on 2004 (age 17–18). He was a contestant in Season 4 of The Voice Kids where he made it to the semi-final. He participated in the Kids United and Friends Tour before joining Kids United Nouvelle Generation. he was a part of the album Sardou et nous where he sang "La Java de Broadway" and "En Chantant" with Lou, Nemo Schifman and Angie Robba. Dylan's favourite singer is Beyoncé.

Ilyana Raho-Moussa
She is of Algerian and Canadians origins. She was a contestant in Season 4 of The Voice Kids where she made it to the semi-final. She is a part of the album Sardou et nous... : she sings Je vole with Nemo Schifman.

Nathan Laface
Nathan was born on 6 June 2006 (age 16). He is Italian-Swiss and is from the Switzerland city of Neuchâtel.
He has dark brown hair, brown eyes, plays soccer and he likes pasta . On July 16  he released his first single "Par amour" feat. Minissia released under his new stage name NTH.
He doesn't publicly speak about his relationships but he does have a girlfriend.

Valentina Tronel

Valentina was born on 6 April 2009 (age 13). She was born in Brittany, France. She auditioned for The Voice Kids at the age of 6, with the song Tra te e il mare by Laura Pausini, though none of the judges selected her for their team. She is the youngest member of Kids United Nouvelle Génération. She also participated in The Tremplin 2018. Two years later, she represented France in the Junior Eurovision Song Contest 2020 with her first single J'imagine. She went on to win the contest, giving France its first victory in the JESC.

Discography

Studio albums

Live albums

Compilation albums

Other releases

Singles

Other charted songs

References

Notes

Sources

External links
Official site

 
French musical groups
Musical groups established in 2015
2015 establishments in France